Równe  is a village in the administrative district of Gmina Dukla, within Krosno County, Subcarpathian Voivodeship, in south-eastern Poland, close to the border with Slovakia.

The village has a population of 2,000.

References

Villages in Krosno County